Kiro Urdin (Macedonian: Киро Урдин; born 1945 in Strumica, Macedonia) is a visual, multimedia artist and film director. He is the artistic founder of the Planetarism movement. He represented France at the French Festival in Tapei, and the Republic of Macedonia at the Thessaloniki - Culture Capital of Europe ’97 event in Greece. His ballet 'Planetarium' (with Debbie Wilson) and his film of the same name were performed at the United Nations 60th Anniversary. He is a member of the Macedonian Academy of Sciences and Arts and the Knight Order in the Order of Art and Literature of the French Republic.

Kiro is a citizen of both Macedonia and France.

Early years
Kiro Urdin was born May 12, 1945 to Mihail Urdinov (Macedonian: Михаил Урдинов) and Makedonka (Македонка). He is the youngest of 5 children: brothers - Kostadin (1930) – a writer, Dragan (1932) – an innovator, Vasil (1935) – sculptor, gallery and restaurant owner), and a sister Katarina (1941).

Kiro initially set out to be a lawyer. He graduated from the University of Belgrade's Law School in 1969. From 1971-1973 he worked as a journalist.

In October 1973 he moved to Paris and painted tourists, since he was doing it without permission his work permit was taken. It was at that point he decided to make painting his life. Then, he enrolled at the Academy of Arts Plastiques in Paris, and in 1977, he graduated as a director from the Paris Film School. From 1982-1984, he worked as an independent painter in France, the United States, Japan, Switzerland, Sweden, Mexico, Belgium, Puerto Rico, Philippines, Taiwan.

Career

Beginnings
Kiro has been painting professionally since 1985.  He is known for his contemporary art paintings which have been exhibited worldwide since 1986. His art has been exhibited in cities like Yokohama, Los Angeles, London, Stockholm and Bratislava. His most famous work to date is Planetarium, a 48 square meter oil on canvas and the first painting to be worked on all over the world.

In 1988, Kiro went to New York and Hollywood to pursue his film ambitions. There he directed four films, one of which was The Art of Kiro Urdin.

The Planetarium Project

In 1996 Kiro embarked on an epic journey around the world, in a pursuit to create the first painting to be worked on all over the world. His idea was to incorporate a piece from every place he visited, thus symbolically bringing the world together in one undivided unity. It took him two years and over thirty locations, from big urban cities to ancient world sites: the Wailing Wall in Jerusalem and the Tomb of Jesus Christ, New York, The Berlin Wall, Nerezi, Ohrid, Brussels, Knokke-le-Zoute, Bruges, Paris, Rome, Pompeii, Pisa, the Suez Canal, London, Stonehenge, Athens, Cape Soúnion, the Nile, the Great Pyramids in Giza, Kenya (Masai Mara), Machu Picchu, Cuzco, Bangkok, Peking (the Forbidden City) and the Great Wall of China, Tokyo, Kamakura, Mont Saint-Michel, Nuenenn and Eindhoven. The result of Kiro's two-year journey was a 48m2 oil painting which he entitled Planetarium.

A film crew was hired to document the effort. A documentary film entitled Planetaruim, was subsequently released. Directed by Ivan Mitevski, it won Best Documentary at the New York International Independent Film and Documentary Festival in 2005.

Also a monograph with photos taken during the two-year trip by Marin Dimevski, was released simultaneously with the movie.

Today the painting is in courtesy of the Danubiana Meulensteen Art Museum in Bratislava.

Collaboration with choreographer Debbie Wilson
Urdin was in the process of taking his painting, Planetarium, to more than 30 countries, and he would add dabs of colour in each new locale. After seeing the painting choreographer Debbie Wilson approached Kiro and proposed to expand the Planetarium experience through a new medium – dance. Macedonian composer Venko Serafimov was called on board to compose the music for the dance. The dance features eight dancers from Wilson’s own troupe, a local Toronto contemporary dance company, and seven from the classically trained Macedonian National Theatre. In an interview for Now Toronto, Debbie admits this kind of setup made the show something of a logistical nightmare.

Planetarium dance premiered in Toronto Dance Theater, Canada, and since it has been performed in Ohrid, Heraclea, Skopje, Chicago, Ankara, and during the commemoration of the United Nations 60th anniversary in Geneva.

Planetarsm and Beyond                   
Kiro’s work has evolved beyond traditional media like film and paintings to include dance, sculpture, literature, photography, philosophy and design. So far, Kiro has published 15 books with aphorisms, one book of poetry entitled ‘Novel’. ‘Light’, a poem from the book was selected for the Pushkin Festival in Moscow.

Kiro has been driven in his efforts by one unifying philosophy: to bridge different cultures together, and to bring all art forms into one. Or as he puts it into his own words, as he defines the slogan of the Planetarism movement: “One Point everywhere, everything in one point. One Art everywhere, everything in one Art.”

Filmography
Urdin's filmography includes the following:

Books
Urdin has authored the following books:

Awards and nominations
During the course of his film career, Kiro has received many awards and nominations.

References

External links 
 
 A Slovakian Contemporary Art Museum Girds for Expansion

1945 births
Living people
People from Strumica
Macedonian artists
Macedonian film directors
University of Belgrade Faculty of Law alumni